Kenneth or Kenny Allen may refer to:

Sports
 Kenny Allen (archer) (born 1969), British Paralympic archer
 Kenny Allen (racing driver) (born 1956), former driver in the Craftsman Truck Series
 Kenny Allen (footballer) (born 1948), retired English professional football goalkeeper
 Kenny Allen (American football) (born 1994), American football punter and placekicker

Others
Ken Allen (composer), American video game composer
Kenneth Allen (murderer) (born 1942), American convicted murderer
Kenneth Allen (physicist) (1923–1997), professor of nuclear physics at the University of Oxford, England
 Kenneth Radway Allen (1911–2008), New Zealand fisheries biologist
Admiral Tibet (Kenneth Allen, born 1960), Jamaican reggae singer

See also
Ken Allen (1971–2000), name given to a Bornean orangutan at the San Diego Zoo

Allen (surname)